Union for the New Republic may refer to:
 Union for the New Republic, defunct political party in France.
 Union for the New Republic, political party in Gabon.
 Union for the New Republic, defunct political party in Guinea.
 Democratic Union for the New Republic, dissolved political party in Italy.